Trypanosoma pestanai is a species of kinetoplastid trypanosomatid.

It causes disease in the European badger (Meles meles).  Its vector is the badger flea (Paraceras melis).

References 

Parasites of mammals
Parasitic excavates
Trypanosomatida